Barkiyan (also Romanized as Barkīyān and Bar-e Keyan) is a village in Lasgerd Rural District, in the Central District of Sorkheh County, Semnan Province, Iran. At the 2006 census, its population was 18, in 6 families.

References 

Populated places in Sorkheh County